Hoskins Field  is a privately owned, public use airport located five nautical miles (6 mi, 9 km) southeast of the central business district of Olympia, in Thurston County, Washington, United States.

Facilities and aircraft 
It has one runway designated 7/25 with a turf surface measuring 2,015 by 116 feet (614 x 35 m).

For the 12-month period ending May 31, 2011, the airport had 450 general aviation aircraft operations, an average of 37 per month. At that time there were 6 aircraft based at this airport, all single-engine.

References

External links 
 Aerial photo as of June 1990 from USGS The National Map

Airports in Washington (state)
Transportation buildings and structures in Thurston County, Washington